Three ships of the Royal Navy have borne the name HMS Wakeful. Another was planned but renamed before being launched:

  was a W-class destroyer launched in 1917 and sunk in 1940.
 HMS Wakeful was to have been a Z-class destroyer, but was renamed  before being launched in 1944.
  was a W-class destroyer, originally built as HMS Zebra but renamed before being launched in 1943. She was converted to a Type 15 frigate between 1951 and 1953, and was sold in 1971.
  was a support vessel commissioned in 1974, paid off in 1987 and sold in 1988.

Royal Navy ship names